The kings (mbangs) or sultans of Bagirmi ruled the sultanate of Bagirmi in central Africa (mostly within present-day Chad).

They include:

See also
Chad
Heads of State of Chad
Heads of Government of Chad
Colonial Heads of Chad
Lists of Incumbents

Political history of Chad
Muslim dynasties
Lists of African rulers
rulers of Bagirmi